Mirakel (Miracle) was the 2020 Sveriges Television's Christmas Calendar. It started airing on 1 December 2020, and ended on 24 December the same year.

Plot

In a laboratory in Sweden before Christmas 2020, the scientists Anna-Carin Davidsson-Colt and Vilgot develop an artificial black hole to be used as an energy source. The black hole is accidentally released and ends up in the rafters of an HVB home where the orphan Mira lives. Mira is soon to be adopted, but does not want to be separated from her friend Galad.

Exactly 100 years earlier (in 1920) and in the same building, then a mansion, the upper-class girl Rakel Colt is getting ready to be photographed with her family. Mira and Rakel both stumble upon the black hole and are involuntarily pulled in by it, switching bodies and time periods.

To raise awareness of global warming, Christmas of 1920 is depicted as snowy while in 2020, there is no snow on the ground.

Roles
 Sarah Rhodin – Mira
 Bibi Lenhoff – Rakel
 Emanuel Kielin – Galad
 Johan Glans – Vilgot
 Babben Larsson – Agneta
 Annika Andersson – Anna-Carin
 Maja Rung – Märta
 Emil Brulin – Ivar
 Andreas Rothlin Svensson – Gustaf
 Oscar Bergman – Einar
 Ossian Nordh – Sören 1920
 Elvira Tröger – maid Sara
 Joel Adolphson – Ernst
 Sten Ljunggren – Storyteller/Sören 2020
 Therese Lindgren – Greta
 Dragomir Mrsic – Andrés
 Marika Carlsson – Schoolteacher 2020
 Jonathan Blode – Schoolteacher 1920
 Rasmus Troedsson – Dr. Bjelke
 Per Svensson – photographer Ahlsten
 Molly – Lady the dog

Music
Gläns över sjö och strand (Chapter 1)
Din klara sol går åter opp (Chapter 12)
Ute är mörkt och kallt (Chapter 13)
Nu tändas tusen juleljus (Chapter 21)
När det lider mot jul (Chapter 21)

References

External links
 

2020 Swedish television series debuts
2020 Swedish television series endings
Sveriges Television's Christmas calendar
Swedish television shows featuring puppetry
2020s time travel television series
Television series set in 1920
Television series set in 2020
Swedish time travel television series
2020s science fiction television series
Fiction about wormholes
Television shows set in Sweden
Climate change in fiction
Fiction about body swapping